Adile is a Turkish feminine given name. Notable people with the name include:

 Adile Sultan (1826–1899), Ottoman princess, daughter of Sultan Mahmud II
 Adile Sultan (1887–1973), Ottoman princess, daughter of Şehzade Mehmed Selaheddin and granddaughter of Sultan Murad V 
 Adile Zogu (1890–1966), sister of King Zog I
 Adile Hanımsultan (1900–1979), Ottoman princess, daughter of Naime Sultan and granddaughter of Sultan Abdülhamid II 
 Adile Ayda (1912–1992), Turkish diplomat
 Adile Naşit (1930–1987), Turkish actress

See also
 Adila (name)

References

Turkish feminine given names